David Murray Schneider (November 11, 1918, Brooklyn, New York – October 30, 1995, Santa Cruz, California) was an American cultural anthropologist, best known for his studies of kinship and as a major proponent of the symbolic anthropology approach to cultural anthropology.

Biography 
He received his B.S. in 1940 and his M.S. from Cornell University in 1941. He received his PhD in Social Anthropology from Harvard in 1949, based on fieldwork on the Micronesian island of Yap.

After completing his graduate work, he first taught at the University of California, Berkeley. In 1960, he accepted a position at the University of Chicago, where he spent most of his career, teaching in Anthropology and the Committee on Human Development. He was Chairman of Anthropology from 1963 to 1966.

While at Chicago, Schneider was director of the Kinship Project, a study supported by the National Science Foundation that looked at how middle-class families in the United States and Great Britain respond to their kinship relations. His findings challenged the common-sense assumption that kinship in Anglo-American cultures is primarily about recognizing biological relatedness. While a rhetoric of "blood" ties is an important conceptual structuring device in US and British kinship systems, cultural and social considerations are more important. The discoveries he demonstrated through a series of books, most famously American Kinship: a cultural account, revolutionized and revitalized the study of kinship within anthropology, on the one hand, and contributed to the theoretical basis of feminist anthropology, gender studies, and lesbian and gay studies, on the other.

Schneider critiqued the so-called Western theories of kinship by accusing its supporters of being ethnocentric.

As a teacher, Schneider was also known for taking on and encouraging students studying nontraditional topics, and as a mentor to women and lesbian or gay graduate students, who often otherwise had difficulty finding mentors.

After retiring from Chicago in 1986, he joined the anthropology department at the University of California, Santa Cruz, where he remained until his death in 1995.

Criticism

Notable students
 Raymond J. DeMallie
 Esther Newton, cultural anthropologist, gay and lesbian communities in U.S.
 Bradd Shore, psychological anthropologist
 Roy Wagner
 Gary Witherspoon

Select bibliography
A Critique of the Study of Kinship 
American Kinship : A Cultural Account
Matrilineal Kinship
Personality in Nature, Society, and Culture
Dialectics and Gender: Anthropological Approaches
History of Public Welfare in New York State: 1867–1940 
The Micronesians of Yap and Their Depopulation (1949)
1995. Schneider on Schneider: The Conversion of the Jews and Other Anthropological Stories by David Schneider, as told to Richard Handler. Ed. Richard Handler. Durham, N.C.: Duke University Press.
1997. "The Power of Culture: Notes on Some Aspects of Gay and Lesbian Kinship in America Today." Cultural Anthropology 12 (2): 270-74.

References

Further reading
Bashkow, Ira. 1991. The Dynamics of Rapport in a Colonial Situation: David Schneider's Fieldwork on the Islands of Yap. In Colonial Situations: Essays on the Contextualization of Ethnographic Knowledge. George Stocking, ed. pp. 170–242. Madison: University of Wisconsin Press.
Feinberg, Richard and Martin Ottenheimer, eds.  The Cultural Analysis of Kinship: The Legacy of David M. Schneider.  Urbana: University of Illinois Press.  2001.

External links
Guide to the David M. Schneider Papers 1918-1994 at the University of Chicago Special Collections Research Center

1918 births
1995 deaths
Symbolic anthropologists
American anthropology writers
Anthropology educators
Cornell University alumni
Harvard University alumni
University of Chicago faculty
University of California, Berkeley faculty
University of California, Santa Cruz faculty
Yap
20th-century American non-fiction writers
20th-century American male writers
American male non-fiction writers
20th-century American anthropologists